The 1990 United States Senate election in Kansas was held November 6, 1990. Incumbent Republican U.S. Senator Nancy Kassebaum was re-elected for a third full term.

Candidates

Democratic 
 Dick Williams, educator at Wichita State University (replacing William R. Roy)

Republican 
 Nancy Kassebaum, incumbent U.S. Senator

Results

See also 
 1990 United States Senate elections

References 

United States Senate
Kansas
1990